Kai Toews (テーブス海, born September 17, 1998) is a Japanese professional basketball player who currently plays for the Shiga Lakes of the B. League. His cousin Jonathan Toews plays for the Chicago Blackhawks of the National Hockey League.

Early life
Toews grew up playing soccer before starting to play basketball in fourth grade. His father, former professional player BT Toews, taught him the fundamentals of the game. Growing up, Toews cited Allen Iverson as his favorite basketball player. Toews attended Keihoku High School for his freshman and sophomore years and was recruited by Japanese universities but had higher ambitions. Toews moved to the United States and attended the Northfield Mount Hermon School in Massachusetts for two years. In his senior season, Toews helped the team to a 31–4 record and the New England Prep Class AAA Championship, earned honorable mention All-NEPSAC honors. UNC Wilmington coach C.B. McGrath offered Toews a scholarship, after seeing him play when McGrath was an assistant at North Carolina.

College career
On November 25, 2018, Toews had a career-high 14 assists against Eastern Illinois. As a freshman, Toews started 32 of 33 games and averaged 8.8 points, 7.7 assists and 2.6 rebounds per game. He finished second in NCAA Division I in assists per game, behind only Murray State's Ja Morant. He set the Colonial Athletic Association single-season assists record with 253 and was named to the CAA All-Rookie Team. Toews was a finalist for the 2019 Kyle Macy Award presented by CollegeInsider.com to the nation's top freshman basketball player. In his sophomore season, Toews started 12 of 13 games for UNC Wilmington and averaged 5.5 points, 4.3 assists, and 2.2 rebounds per game. After the team's game against Vanderbilt on December 21, 2019, Toews announced he was leaving the team to pursue professional opportunities. “Obviously, it was a total surprise to us,” coach McGrath said. Toews finished his career with 362 points, 112 rebounds and 309 assists.

Professional career
On January 10, 2020, Toews signed a professional contract with the Utsunomiya Brex in Japan.

National team career
Toews has played for Japan's Under-15 and Under-19 national teams. Toews competed for Japan in the 2019 William Jones Cup in Taiwan.

References

External links
UNC Wilmington Seahawks bio

1998 births
Living people
Basketball players from Tokyo
Utsunomiya Brex players
Japanese men's basketball players
Point guards
Japanese expatriate basketball people in the United States
UNC Wilmington Seahawks men's basketball players